Dizaj-e Herik (also Romanized as Dīzaj-e Herīk; also known as Dīzaj-e Arīk) is a village in Qarah Su Rural District, in the Central District of Khoy County, West Azerbaijan Province, Iran. At the 2006 census, its population was 363, in 87 families.

References 

Populated places in Khoy County